John Barrett (November 28, 1866 – October 17, 1938) was a United States diplomat and one of the most influential early directors general of the Pan American Union. On his death, the New York Times commented that he had "done more than any other person of his generation to promote closer relations among the American republics".

Biography
Barrett was born in Grafton, Vermont on November 28, 1866. He graduated from Worcester Academy in 1883, then studied at both Vanderbilt University and Dartmouth College, eventually graduating from the latter with a Bachelor of Arts degree in 1889. From 1889 to 1894, he worked as a journalist on the west coast (especially Tacoma, Seattle, Portland, and San Francisco). While working as a journalist, he so impressed President Grover Cleveland during a meeting that he was appointed as the United States U.S. Minister to Siam (now Thailand). He served in that country for four years working to improve trade relations before returning to life as a journalist, working as a war correspondent during the Spanish–American War and then as a diplomatic adviser to Admiral George Dewey. (He would write a biography of Dewey in 1899.) Finally, he was appointed as a delegate to the second Pan-American Conference in 1901 through the following year. 

In 1903, he was appointed as the Minister to Argentina, and though he only served in that position for one year, President Theodore Roosevelt later remarked that he had begun a "new United States-Argentine era". He was then appointed as Minister to Panama and then to Colombia.

In 1907, he was appointed at the first Director General of the Bureau of American Republics, an international organization that was renamed as the Pan American Union in 1910 (and subsequently reorganized in 1948 as the Organization of American States). He served in this capacity for fourteen years. During that period, he also founded the Pan-American Society of the United States, was Secretary General of 1916's Pan-American Scientific Congress, and presided over the Pan-American Commercial Congresses of 1911 and 1919. 

In 1924, he briefly entered politics by running for the United States Senate as a Republican, but withdrew from the race before the election.

In his life, Barrett received honorary doctorates from Tulane University, the University of Southern California, the National University of Colombia in Bogotá, and the National University of Panama. He also received state decorations from Venezuela and China. 

He died of pneumonia in 1938.

References

 Mellander, Gustavo A., Mellander, Nelly, Charles Edward Magoon: The Panama Years. Río Piedras, Puerto Rico: Editorial Plaza Mayor. ISBN 1-56328-155-4. OCLC 42970390. (1999)
 Mellander, Gustavo A., The United States in Panamanian Politics: The Intriguing Formative Years." Danville, Ill.: Interstate Publishers. OCLC 138568. (1971)

1866 births
1938 deaths
People from Grafton, Vermont
Vermont Republicans
Worcester Academy alumni
Dartmouth College alumni
Deaths from pneumonia in Vermont
Ambassadors of the United States to Argentina
Ambassadors of the United States to Thailand
Ambassadors of the United States to Panama
Ambassadors of the United States to Colombia
Vermont Academy alumni
19th-century American diplomats
20th-century American diplomats